The Rochat-Louise-Sauerwein Block are a group of buildings that comprise one of the few remaining intact Victorian commercial blocks in Saint Paul, Minnesota, United States.  They were built 1885-1895 by Castner, Hermann Kretz, and Edward P. Bassford, and are listed on the National Register of Historic Places.

References

Commercial buildings completed in 1895
National Register of Historic Places in Saint Paul, Minnesota
Commercial buildings on the National Register of Historic Places in Minnesota
Victorian architecture in Minnesota